Nahla Summers is an author and social campaigner. She has undertaken various physical challenges for which she asks people to show support by doing acts of kindness for strangers.

In 2014 Summers founded a social enterprise called Sunshine People which aims to celebrate and motivate acts of kindness. She also runs an enterprise called A Culture of Kindness which aims to improve business practices.

In 2018, Summers cycled 3015 miles from San Diego to San Augustine in the United States. In 2020 she cycled 5007 miles over four months on an ElliptiGO bicycle, writing a Strava art across England in the form of the word Kindness

Honours
 Awarded with a Point of Light award by the Prime Minister Theresa May in 2018.
 Silver winner of the Charity Film Awards in 2019.
 Gold winner of the Charity Film Awards in 2020 for We are Sunshine People.

Bibliography

References

Living people
British long-distance runners
Ultra-distance cyclists
Alumni of the University of Leeds
British writers
Year of birth missing (living people)